Guernsey Electricity Limited (GE) is the sole commercial electricity supplier on the island of Guernsey. GE has been operating for over 100 years, moving from local generation of power from coal, and later oil, to investing in cables to connect into the grids in Jersey and France through the Channel Islands Electricity Grid.

History

Early electricity uses in Guernsey
In 1887 a dynamo was used to generate street lighting in front of Randalls Brewery in the Avenue, followed in 1897 by a water powered first domestic installation at Le Chalet, Fermain bay.

In 1898 Edmundsons Electricity Corporation was granted the concession to build and operate an electricity supply in Guernsey.  of cables would have to be installed below ground within two years. In February 1900 150 kW could be generated from the power station at Les Amballes, St Peter Port.

Prepayment meters had to be provided that would take English or French coins, there being three currencies in operation in Guernsey at that time, £1 Guernsey being equal to 19s British and 10d Guernsey being equal to 1 French franc. Units being sold at 7d for the first unit per day and 4d thereafter.

The quarry industry needed electricity for cranes and in 1902 it was decided to build a second power station at St Sampson’s taking the generating capacity to 870 kW with units supplied rising from 65,000 to 1.75m a year in 1910.  A 2,500 volt DC cable connected the two generating centres. A battery storage system was used to provide a 24-hour service meaning the generators only needed to operate four days a week. With 1,000 consumers by 1910, the average price per unit fell to an average of 2½d.

Guernsey Electric Light and Power Company Limited
In 1907 a company was formed, Guernsey Electric Light and Power Company Limited to run the Edmunsons business in Guernsey. Between 1908 and 1911 diesel generators were installed at both power stations, increasing capacity to 1,340 kW. An explosion in November 1918 at the Vale power station left the road covered in debris. The increased price of coal and oil during World War I and the requirement to expand the network resulted in a new law which increased tariffs and allowed overhead lines to be installed in country areas.

 Connections created to charge electric vehicles – 1914
 Wind turbine built – 1925 

It would be supervised by the States Electricity Board.

1934 saw the start of a 50 Hz 230 V AC supply, however some existing consumers took decades to change from DC. In 1938 the last coal-fired generator was retired as new fuel tanks were built to store oil. By 1939 an additional 110 km of mains cables were installed with 17 additional substations built and 6.9m units were sold a year to 5,774 consumers.

Occupation
In June 1940 two thirds of the employees were evacuated to England, leaving 36 volunteer employees to suffer the German occupation. Restrictions were placed on electricity usage, sufficient oil was available to provide reduced power until May 1941. The generation of power from burning waste was tested, with coal burning as a backup system, it helped meet the minimum essential load requirement of 145 kW. Supply fell to 3.4m kW, the main user of power was the German occupiers with most of their power being paid for by the States of Guernsey. Limited supplies of oil arrived on the island and generators were changed to run off town gas. The Organisation Todt (OT) who were constructing defences in the island were required to arrange for the delivery of oil to generate the electricity they needed.

The winter of 1942-3 showed excessive unit usage, which could be demonstrated that 75% of usage was to German-occupied premises with a number of illegal connections. Further restrictions were imposed in October 1943 allowing four units of power per week per house. The OT built a power station to run off anthracite and coal in the Petit Bouet with a 720 kW capacity and using sea water for cooling.

By January 1945 electric power was barely available to process milk or purify and pump water. Coal brought in by the Red Cross of the SS Vega in April allowed coke to be produced from which electricity could be generated for civilian use. Guernsey was liberated on 9 May 1945.

Post War
The immediate aftermath of the war saw repairs necessary in many areas however replacement machinery was hard to obtain.

During the 1950s demand increased rapidly with sales reaching 32.5m units and consumers rising to 14,805. An AC ring main was constructed around the island. Eight new generators were acquired giving a capacity of 12.5MW. DC was replaced with AC when opportunities arose however there were still over 600 DC customers in 1966.

A new generating hall ‘B’ was built. as demand continued to rise and more generators were acquired, including a Stal Laval GT35 gas turbine, taking the total to 24, including 12 Mirrlees KVSS12 and 6 Mirrlees Major’s, providing 54.6MW. By 1970 consumers reached 21,507 with 130.7m units sold. ‘C’ engine hall was constructed in 1979 to house new Sulzer 9RNF68 generators and ‘A’ hall decommissioned. The 1980s saw capacity increase to 72MW in 1984 which was adequate for the maximum demand of 43MW, however demand was still increasing reaching 64.5MW on 8 January 1997, a new Sulzer 9RTA58 generator was housed in the new ‘D’ generating hall and two new Thomassen gas turbines were acquired. The last DC customer was Randalls Brewery which converted their bottling plant to AC in 1987.

In 1998 GE was commercialised as a trading company with assets of £91.5m. Thermal efficiency of generating plant had risen to 43%, system load factor had reached 58% and distribution system losses reduced to 9.5%.

Undersea cables

In the mid 1970s investigations were undertaken to determine the practicality of a cable. Jersey connected to France in 1984 (EDF1). No decision was taken until 1996 when it was agreed to connect Guernsey to Jersey (GJ1) and lay a second 90 MW cable (Normandie 2) from France to Jersey, the work being completed in 2000 at a cost of £50m. The cables contain a 24 fibre optic communications cable.

A second 100MW DC cable (GJ2) was planned to be installed in 2016, two years earlier than planned  to replace the existing GJ1 which was starting to fail, together with another cable (Normandie 1) from France to Jersey replacing the old EDF1 cable.

GE has invested heavily in the Channel Islands Electricity Grid using debt to finance the investment.

Current

Despite the cable connection to France providing most of the electricity units sold in Guernsey, the power station needs to maintain sufficient capacity to generate power should the cable fail. Eight oil fired diesel engines and three oil fired gas turbines including two new diesel engines, given the names "Trudy"and "Freddy", costing £15m each which were installed in engine room "D" in March 2017. Environmental and cost considerations require the maximum use of the cable link.

Minimum demand is around 23MW with peak demand in 2010/11 of 85MW. Revenue in 2012/13 was £53m. It is predicted that demand will continue to increase. In 2011/12 82% of electricity was imported using the cable link. Customers now exceed 30,000.

A retail shop is attached to the power station at North Side, Vale.

GE is governed by the Electricity (Guernsey) Law, 2001 as amended and is regulated by the Channel Islands Competition and Regulatory Authorities.

See also

 Guernsey Electricity's website

References

Electric power companies of Guernsey
Energy companies established in 1907